Snake Run is a tributary of the Beaver River in western Pennsylvania.  The stream rises in south-central Lawrence County and flows southwest entering the Beaver River at Wampum, Pennsylvania. The watershed is roughly 20% agricultural, 71% forested and the rest is other uses.

See also
List of rivers of Pennsylvania

References

Rivers of Pennsylvania
Tributaries of the Beaver River
Rivers of Lawrence County, Pennsylvania
Allegheny Plateau